Radical 130 or radical meat meaning "meat" is one of the 29 Kangxi radicals (214 radicals in total) composed of 6 strokes.

In the Kangxi Dictionary, there are 674 characters (out of 49,030) to be found under this radical.

 is also the 132nd indexing component in the Table of Indexing Chinese Character Components predominantly adopted by Simplified Chinese dictionaries published in mainland China.

Evolution

Derived characters

Variant forms

This radical character has different forms in different languages when used as a left component. Traditionally, the writing form of the radical character as a left component is hardly distinguishable with Radical 74 (月 "moon"). In the Kangxi Dictionary, 月 which means the "moon" has its two horizontal strokes' right ends detached from the frame, while those in 月 which means "meat" are connected to the frame. In modern Japanese and Simplified Chinese, this difference no longer exists.

In modern Traditional Chinese used in Hong Kong and Taiwan, the two horizontal strokes in 月 meaning "meat" are altered to a dot and an upward horizontal stroke, a change that also applies to printing typefaces despite historically it was only used as a handwriting variant.

Literature

External links

Unihan Database - U+8089

130
132